Nafech (also Romanized as Nāfech and Nāfch; also known as Nafeh and Nafej) is a city in the Central District of Shahrekord County, Chaharmahal and Bakhtiari province, Iran. At the 2006 census, its population was 3,814 in 903 households. The following census in 2011 counted 3,975 people in 1,089 households. The latest census in 2016 showed a population of 4,059 people in 1,168 households. The city is populated by Persians.

References 

Shahrekord County

Cities in Chaharmahal and Bakhtiari Province

Populated places in Chaharmahal and Bakhtiari Province

Populated places in Shahr-e Kord County